Bloomquist (Anglicized form of Swedish Blomkvist, Blomqvist or Blomquist) is a surname. Notable people with the surname include:

Paul Bloomquist (1932–1972), US-Army officer
Scott Bloomquist (born 1963), race car driver 
Willie Bloomquist (born 1977), baseball player

See also
Bloomquist Creek, a stream in San Mateo County, California 
Blomqvist
Blomquist